Peace gaming is a neologism coined by Utsumi Takeshi to describe non-military global simulations, or simulations that involve both military and civilian variables.

Peace gaming is based on the idea that global simulations which are modeled entirely on military actions (war gaming) can never be more than zero-sum games. In other words, in order for one side to achieve its objective, all others must lose. Proponents of peace gaming simulations argue that when "civilian" factors which exist in the real world, such as the economy, manufacturing, and trade are brought into play, the simulation becomes not only more realistic but also ceases to be a zero-sum game. Through collaborative action on the part of the competitors as opposed to purely confrontational, all sides can gain benefit and thus all can theoretically claim victory.

See also

 Utsumi Takeshi
 Game theory

External links
"Globally Collaborative Environmental Peace Gaming", Utsumi's paper (2003 edition) describing the concept
"Peace Gaming on the Scale of Pentagon War Gaming"

Simulation